"Go, Boy Go" is a song written by Floyd Wilson, performed by Carl Smith, and released on the Columbia label (catalog no. 21226). In August 1954, it peaked at No. 4 on the Billboard country and western chart. It was also ranked No. 29 on Billboards 1954 year-end country and western retail chart.

See also
 Billboard Top Country & Western Records of 1954

References

Carl Smith (musician) songs
1954 songs
Columbia Nashville Records singles